Cultana is a locality on the northeastern part of Eyre Peninsula in South Australia. It is much larger than the original locality, and includes the Australian Army's Cultana Training Area. It includes the former Baxter Detention Centre which operated from 2002 to 2007. It spans the Lincoln Highway and Iron Knob to Whyalla Road, as well as being bordered by the Eyre Highway east of Iron Knob.

Former locality
The former locality of Cultana was near where the Port Bonython Road meets the Lincoln Highway and included Tregalana Park. It was absorbed into Whyalla Barson in September 2014.

See also
Hundred of Cultana
List of cities and towns in South Australia

References

Eyre Peninsula
Towns in South Australia
Far North (South Australia)